Moriac is a closed station on the Warrnambool railway line, located in the town of Moriac, Victoria. The station opened on 1 October 1877, and was one of 35 stations in Victoria, and five on the Warrnambool line, which were closed to passenger traffic on 4 October 1981, as part of the so-called New Deal for country passengers.

Moriac station was the junction of the short branch line south to Wensleydale, which opened in 1889, and was closed in 1948. 

The station was the scene of a fatal accident in April 1952. A woman was killed when a Melbourne-bound train collided with a Warrnambool-bound train which was still shunting into siding at the station to allow the Melbourne-bound train to pass it on the single track. The victim was in the first carriage of the Melbourne-bound train, which was telescoped after being forced into the tender of the locomotive.

The bluestone platform facing remains, along with the earth goods loading bank, and a wooden buffer stop.

References

Railway stations closed in 1981
Disused railway stations in Victoria (Australia)